Alfred T. Hawkins (born 1904, date of death unknown) was a professional footballer who played in the Football League as a forward for Crystal Palace. He also played non-league football for Southall F.C.

Playing career
Hawkins began his career with Southall, then playing in the Athenian League and in November 1925, signed for Crystal Palace of the Football League Third Division South. He made his debut in a home 0–2 defeat to Gillingham and went on to make 19 league appearances in 1925–26, scoring seven times. In January 1926, Hawkins played in a home FA Cup tie against Chelsea scoring once in a 2–1 win. However, he made only one appearance in 1926–27 (one goal) and at the end of the season, left the club.

References

External links
Hawkins at holmesdale.net

1904 births
English footballers
Association football forwards
English Football League players
Crystal Palace F.C. players
Southall F.C. players
Sportspeople from Surrey
Year of death missing